Limestone Coast zone is a wine zone located in the south east of South Australia.  It extends south of a line of latitude approximately in line with Cape Willoughby at the east end of Kangaroo Island and it is bounded by the continental coastline and the border with Victoria.  It consists of the following wine regions all of which have received appellation as an Australian Geographical Indication (AGI): Coonawarra, Mount Benson, Mount Gambier, Robe, Padthaway, Wrattonbully and a small number of vineyards located outside the above regions.  The zone received AGI in 1996.

Extent and appellation 

The Limestone Coast zone is located in the south-east of South Australia bounded by the continental coastline to the south, the border with the neighbouring state of Victoria to the east and the Lower Murray wine zone to the north.  The wine zone is the land south of a line located at appropriately 36 degrees 50 minutes south, i.e. in line with Cape Willoughby at the east end of Kangaroo Island.  The term ‘Limestone Coast’ was registered as an AGI under the Wine Australia Corporation Act 1980 on 27 December 1996.

Constituent regions
The wine zone includes the Coonawarra, Mount Benson, Mount Gambier, Robe, Padthaway and Wrattonbully wine regions.

Coonawarra wine region

 
The Coonawarra wine region covers an area centred on the strip of land adjoining both sides of the Riddoch Highway mainly north of the town of Penola.  The region is presumably named after the town of Coonawarra which is located within the extent of the region.  The region is bordered by the Wrattonbilly region in the north, by the Mount Gambier region in the south and by the Victorian border in the east.  The term ‘Coonawarra’ was registered as an AGI on 6 January 2003.

Mount Benson wine region

The Mount Benson wine region extends over an area partially rectilinear  in shape with Cape Jaffa at its north west corner, Cape Thomas at the north end of Guichen Bay in the south and the north end of Lake Hawdon in the south east corner.    It borders with the Robe wine region on its east and south sides.  The term ‘Mount Benson’ was registered as an AGI on 18 March 1997.

Mount Gambier wine region

Mount Gambier wine region is located around the regional city of Mount Gambier and borders with the Coonawarra wine region on its north, the Victoria border to its east and the continental coastline to its south.  The first planting of vines occurred in 1982.  The region received appellation as an Australian Geographical Indication in 2010 and as of 2014, is represented by 20 vineyards and eight wineries.

Padthaway wine region

The Padthaway wine region extends from Naracoorte in a north westerly direction along the  Riddoch Highway passing through Padthaway and ceasing when the Riddoch Highway turns north towards Bordertown.   The term ‘Padthaway’ was registered as an AGI on 29 November 1999.

Robe wine region

The region is presumably named after the town of Robe which is located within its extent. The term ‘Robe’ was registered as an AGI on 15 August 2006.

Wrattonbully wine region

The Wrattonbully wine region extents from north of Naracoorte where it borders with the Padthaway wine region to the east where it is bounded by the state border with Victoria and to the south east where it borders with the Coonawarra wine region just north of Penola.  The region is presumably named after the town of Wrattonbully which is located within its extent.  The term ‘Wrattonbully’ was registered as an AGI on  5 July 2005.

Other wine growing areas within the Limestone Coast zone
Vineyards exist in the zone outside the registered regions in the following areas - the area west of Bordertown and Mundulla, the area between Lucindale, Callendale, Bool Lagoon and Penola, and the area immediately east of the Mount Benson region.

See also

South Australian wine

Citations and references

Citations

References

External links
Limestone Coast Grape & Wine Council Inc. regional peak body

Wine regions of South Australia
Limestone Coast